Ortalis alternatus is a species of ulidiid or picture-winged fly in the genus Ortalis of the family Ulidiidae.

References

I

Ortalis (fly)